Honourable Sri Justice Kothapalli Punnaiah (1924 – 1 December 2018) was an Indian politician and latterly high Court judge.

Biography 
He served as the Judge of High Court of Andhra Pradesh from 1974 - 1985. He was one of the 11 member Constitution Review Committee proposed by NDA government in 2000. He also served as the chairman of state SC/ST Commission.

Background
He was born in 1924. After a brief stint as a lawyer in Srikakulam district court during 1952–53, Punnaiah took to politics and was first elected to the state assembly in 1955 from the Cheepurupally constituency in Srikakulam district. He has also served as vice-president of the Srikakulam Zilla Parishad in 1958 and was elected to the assembly unopposed in 1962. After having a political career he took to Judicial career and elevated to the level of Judge of High Court.

His politician daughter, K. Pratibha Bharati, was the speaker of the Andhra Pradesh assembly, the first woman in the state to occupy the coveted post.

Death
He died at the age of 95 years in 2018 at Visakhapatnam.

References

People from Srikakulam district
20th-century Indian judges
Andhra Pradesh district councillors
Judges of the Andhra Pradesh High Court
Members of the Andhra Pradesh Legislative Assembly
People from Uttarandhra
1924 births
2018 deaths
Indian National Congress politicians from Andhra Pradesh